GRSE Mauritius offshore patrol vessel (MOPV) is a corvette being built by Garden Reach Shipbuilders and Engineers (GRSE), Kolkata, for the National Coast Guard of Mauritius.

Order...( MOPV )
The offshore patrol vessel is being built as per the agreement signed in Mauritius on March 4, 2011 between GRSE Kolkata and the Government of the Republic of Mauritius. The total contract value of the vessel is US$58.5 million. Of this amount, US$10 million will be a one-time grant from the Government of India and the remainder US$48.5 million will be extended under a Line of Credit through the EXIM Bank of India to the Government of Mauritius.

Design and construction
As per the agreement, GRSE would design, construct and deliver the vessel in a stipulated time of 42 months from the date of signing the contract. The ship will be fitted with state-of-the-art main engines, with an engine control and bridge system which will integrate all communication and navigation systems. The ship will be provided with improved habitability with fully air conditioned modular accommodation for a crew of 93.

The vessel will be fitted with a close-range naval gun and an optical Fire Control System as well as advanced Global Maritime Distress and Safety System. The OPV will be able to carry a light helicopter, a rigid hull inflatable boat, a landing craft vehicle and a rubber inflatable boat. The OPV will enhance security in the Exclusive economic zone of Mauritius by carrying out anti-piracy, anti-smuggling and anti-narcotics operations. It will also perform logistic support operations including transportation of small detachment of personnel and conduct pollution response, external fire-fighting and helicopter operations.

GRSE laid down the keel of the patrol vessel at their main yard on 23 April 2012.

See also
 Praga-class patrol boat
 Mandovi Marine (15 Meter)-Class Patrol Craft
Military of Mauritius

References

External links
 National Coast Guard of Mauritius

National Coast Guard of Mauritius
Patrol ship classes